Ahmed Abou Moslem Farag (born 25 July 1981 in Cairo) is an Egyptian footballer currently playing as a left back.

Club career

Early career
Ahmed Abou Moslem started his career at Dina Farms in Egypt.  He was selected to represent the Egypt national under-20 football team in the 2001 FIFA World Youth Championship.  He helped Egypt win the bronze medal.  Due to his success, he joined El Ahly where he spent four years.

France move
Abou Moslem joined the French side Strasbourg in 2005.  In January 2009, Abou Moslem Joined French side AC Ajaccio for a six months loan deal.

European offers
Abou was close to signing to several European clubs during his time in France.  Strasbourg rejected offers from Crystal Palace, PAOK, and Hamburg SV.

Return to Egypt
In July 2009, Abou Moslem returned to Egypt. He joined Egyptian Premier League side Ismaily with a three years Contract. However, Abo Moslem failed to establish himself in the first team. Therefore, he terminated his contract with mutual consent after spending only one season at the club. On 1 July 2010, it was announced that Abou Moslem joined El-Entag El-Harby (a.k.a. Military Production). He penned a 3-year contract with the club.

International career
He was selected to represent the Egypt national under-20 football team in the 2001 FIFA World Youth Championship. Egypt reached the semifinals and won the bronze medal and also came 3rd in the U-20 African Nations Cup.

Honours

Al Ahly
 CAF Champions League: 2001, 2005.
 Egyptian League: 2004-05.
 Section of Egypt: 2003.
 Section of Egypt Finalist: 2004.

Strasbourg
 Ligue 2: 2006-07 (won promotion, 3rd place).

Egypt U-20
 2001 FIFA World Youth Championship: Bronze Medal.
 2001 African Youth Championship: Bronze Medal.

References

External links 
 
 player profile at www.socceregypt.com
 

1981 births
Living people
Egyptian footballers
Egypt international footballers
RC Strasbourg Alsace players
AC Ajaccio players
Egyptian expatriate footballers
Expatriate footballers in Romania
Expatriate footballers in France
Liga I players
Ligue 1 players
Footballers from Cairo
Association football fullbacks